The 2021 Open de Oeiras III was a professional tennis tournament played on clay courts. It was the third edition of the tournament which was part of the 2021 ATP Challenger Tour. It took place in Oeiras, Portugal between 17 and 23 May 2021.

Singles main-draw entrants

Seeds

 1 Rankings are as of 10 May 2021.

Other entrants
The following players received wildcards into the singles main draw:
  Nuno Borges
  João Domingues
  Gastão Elias

The following player received entry into the singles main draw as an alternate:
  Frederico Ferreira Silva

The following players received entry from the qualifying draw:
  Zizou Bergs
  Emilio Gómez
  Hugo Grenier
  Alex Molčan

Champions

Singles

 Carlos Alcaraz def.  Facundo Bagnis 6–4, 6–4.

Doubles

 Hunter Reese /  Sem Verbeek def.  Sadio Doumbia /  Fabien Reboul 4–6, 6–4, [10–7].

References

2021 ATP Challenger Tour
2021 in Portuguese tennis
May 2021 sports events in Portugal